Lena Annie Whitehead (born 16 July 1955 in Oldham, Lancashire, England) is an English jazz trombone player.

Career
Whitehead learned the trombone in high school and participated in rock and jazz bands. When she was 16, she left school to become a member of a female big band led by Ivy Benson. She played with the band for two years before moving to Jersey. Unhappy with the life of a musician, she quit music for almost six years. She returned in 1979 and started a ska band. She took an interest in jazz again after moving to London two years later and performing in pubs. In the 1980s, she toured with Brotherhood of Breath, a big band led by South African pianist Chris McGregor.

During her career, she has worked with ...And the Native Hipsters, Blur, Carla Bley, Charlie Watts Orchestra, Fun Boy Three, Jah Wobble, Jamiroquai, John Stevens, Penguin Cafe Orchestra, Smiley Culture, Spice Girls, and Working Week. She was a member of The Zappatistas, a Frank Zappa tribute band led by guitarist John Etheridge.

Discography
 Mix Up 1984
 This is ...Rude 1994
 Naked 1997
 Home
 The Gathering 2000

References

1955 births
Living people
English jazz trombonists
British lesbian musicians
English LGBT musicians
People from Oldham
Women jazz musicians
21st-century trombonists
21st-century English women musicians
Penguin Cafe Orchestra members
Brotherhood of Breath members
Women trombonists
20th-century English LGBT people
21st-century English LGBT people